The 2011–12 Colorado Avalanche season was the 40th overall season for the franchise, the 33rd since joining the NHL, and 17th since relocating to Colorado.

The Avalanche failed to qualify for the Stanley Cup playoffs, finishing seven points behind the eighth-placed Los Angeles Kings in the Western Conference.

Off-Season
On June 16, 2011, the Avalanche promoted former player Adam Deadmarsh to assistant coach. Deadmarsh will take Steve Konowalchuk's place behind the bench, as Konowalchuk has accepted the head coaching position for the Western Hockey League's Seattle Thunderbirds.

Captain Adam Foote retired.

Regular season
The Avalanche retired Peter Forsberg's number 21 jersey on opening night, October 8.

On November 14, the Avalanche named Milan Hejduk as the third captain in Avalanche history.

The Avalanche had the fewest power-play opportunities of all 30 teams, with just 223.

Standings

Schedule and results

Pre-season 

|- align="center" bgcolor="#FFBBBB"
| 1 || September 22 || Colorado Avalanche || 2–5 || Dallas Stars || || Cann || 0–1–0 || 
|- align="center" bgcolor="#FFBBBB"
| 2 || September 23 || St. Louis Blues || 3–2 || Colorado Avalanche || || Varlamov || 0–2–0 || 
|- align="center" bgcolor="#ccffcc"
| 3 || September 25 || Dallas Stars || 0–3 || Colorado Avalanche || || Giguere || 1–2–0 || 
|- align="center" bgcolor="#FFBBBB"
| 4 || September 28 || Los Angeles Kings || 6–0 || Colorado Avalanche || || Varlamov || 1–3–0 || 
|- align="center" bgcolor="#FFBBBB"
| 5 || September 29 || Colorado Avalanche || 1–3 || St. Louis Blues || || Giguere || 1–4–0 || 
|- align="center" bgcolor="#ccffcc"
| 6 || October 1 (in Las Vegas, Nevada) || Colorado Avalanche || 4–1 || Los Angeles Kings || || Varlamov || 2–4–0 || 
|-

Regular season

|- align="center" bgcolor="#FFBBBB"
| 1 || October 8 || Detroit Red Wings || 3–0 || Colorado Avalanche || || Varlamov || 18,007 || 0–1–0 || 0 ||  
|- align="center" bgcolor="#ccffcc"
| 2 || October 10 || Colorado Avalanche || 1–0 || Boston Bruins || || Varlamov || 17,565 || 1–1–0 || 2 || 
|- align="center" bgcolor="#ccffcc"
| 3 || October 12 || Colorado Avalanche || 3–2 || Columbus Blue Jackets || SO || Varlamov || 8,986 || 2–1–0 || 4 || 
|- align="center" bgcolor="#ccffcc"
| 4 || October 13 || Colorado Avalanche || 7–1 || Ottawa Senators || || Giguere || 19,239 || 3–1–0 || 6 || 
|- align="center" bgcolor="#ccffcc"
| 5 || October 15 || Colorado Avalanche || 6–5 || Montreal Canadiens || SO || Varlamov || 21,273 || 4–1–0 || 8 ||  
|- align="center" bgcolor="#ccffcc"
| 6 || October 17 || Colorado Avalanche || 3–2 || Toronto Maple Leafs || OT || Giguere || 19,359 || 5–1–0 || 10 ||  
|- align="center" bgcolor="#FFBBBB"
| 7 || October 20 || Chicago Blackhawks || 3–1 || Colorado Avalanche || || Varlamov || 17,523 || 5–2–0 || 10 || 
|- align="center" bgcolor="#ccffcc"
| 8 || October 22 || Colorado Avalanche || 5–4 || Chicago Blackhawks || SO || Varlamov || 21,328 || 6–2–0 || 12 || 
|- align="center" bgcolor="#FFBBBB"
| 9 || October 26 || Colorado Avalanche || 2–4 || Calgary Flames || || Giguere || 19,289 || 6–3–0 || 12 || 
|- align="center" bgcolor="#FFBBBB"
| 10 || October 28 || Edmonton Oilers || 3–1 || Colorado Avalanche || || Varlamov || 15,057 || 6–4–0 || 12 || 
|- align="center" bgcolor="#ccffcc"
| 11 || October 30 || Los Angeles Kings || 2–3 || Colorado Avalanche || || Varlamov || 12,355 || 7–4–0 || 14 || 
|-

|- align="center" bgcolor="#FFBBBB"
| 12 || November 2 || Phoenix Coyotes || 4–1  || Colorado Avalanche || || Varlamov || 12,141 || 7–5–0 || 14 || 
|- align="center" bgcolor="white"
| 13 || November 4 || Colorado Avalanche || 6–7 || Dallas Stars || OT || Varlamov || 11,981 || 7–5–1 || 15 || 
|- align="center" bgcolor="#FFBBBB"
| 14 || November 6 || Calgary Flames || 2–1 || Colorado Avalanche ||  || Varlamov || 15,356 || 7–6–1 || 15 || 
|- align="center" bgcolor="#FFBBBB"
| 15 || November 8 || Colorado Avalanche || 2–5 || Detroit Red Wings || || Varlamov || 20,066 || 7–7–1 || 15 || 
|- align="center" bgcolor="#ccffcc"
| 16 || November 10 || New York Islanders || 3–4 || Colorado Avalanche || OT || Giguere || 13,221 || 8–7–1 || 17 || 
|- align="center" bgcolor="#FFBBBB"
| 17 || November 12 || Calgary Flames || 4–3 || Colorado Avalanche || || Varlamov || 14,919 || 8–8–1 || 17 || 
|- align="center" bgcolor="#FFBBBB"
| 18 || November 15 || Colorado Avalanche || 3–6 || Pittsburgh Penguins || || Varlamov || 18,483 || 8–9–1 || 17 || 
|- align="center" bgcolor="#FFBBBB"
| 19 || November 17 || Colorado Avalanche || 0–1 || Minnesota Wild || || Giguere || 16,779 || 8–10–1 || 17 || 
|- align="center" bgcolor="#ccffcc"
| 20 || November 18 || Dallas Stars || 0–3 || Colorado Avalanche || || Giguere || 16,091 || 9–10–1 || 19 || 
|- align="center" bgcolor="#FFBBBB"
| 21 || November 20 || San Jose Sharks || 4–1 || Colorado Avalanche || || Giguere || 15,013 || 9–11–1 || 19 || 
|- align="center" bgcolor="#FFBBBB"
| 22 || November 23 || Vancouver Canucks || 3–0 || Colorado Avalanche ||  || Varlamov || 15,538 || 9–12–1 || 19 || 
|- align="center" bgcolor="#ccffcc"
| 23 || November 26 || Edmonton Oilers || 2–5 || Colorado Avalanche || || Varlamov || 17,684 || 10–12–1 || 21 || 
|- align="center" bgcolor="#FFBBBB"
| 24 || November 28 || Dallas Stars || 3–1 || Colorado Avalanche || || Varlamov || 12,015 || 10–13–1 || 21 || 
|- align="center" bgcolor="#ccffcc"
| 25 || November 30 || New Jersey Devils || 1–6 || Colorado Avalanche || || Varlamov || 14,251 || 11–13–1 || 23 || 
|-

|- align="center" bgcolor="#ccffcc"
| 26 || December 2 || St. Louis Blues || 2–3 || Colorado Avalanche || SO || Varlamov || 15,966 || 12–13–1 || 25 || 
|- align="center" bgcolor="#ccffcc"
| 27 || December 4 || Detroit Red Wings || 2–4 || Colorado Avalanche || || Varlamov || 17,014 || 13–13–1 || 27 || 
|- align="center" bgcolor="#FFBBBB"
| 28 || December 6 || Colorado Avalanche || 0–6 || Vancouver Canucks || || Varlamov || 18,890 || 13–14–1 || 27 || 
|- align="center" bgcolor="#FFBBBB"
| 29 || December 8 || Colorado Avalanche || 2–3 || Calgary Flames || || Giguere || 19,289 || 13–15–1 || 27 || 
|- align="center" bgcolor="#FFBBBB"
| 30 || December 9 || Colorado Avalanche || 1–4 || Edmonton Oilers || || Varlamov || 16,839 || 13–16–1 || 27 || 
|- align="center" bgcolor="#ccffcc"
| 31 || December 13 || San Jose Sharks || 3–4 || Colorado Avalanche || SO || Varlamov || 14,374 || 14–16–1 || 29 || 
|- align="center" bgcolor="#FFBBBB"
| 32 || December 15 || Colorado Avalanche || 4–5 || San Jose Sharks || || Varlamov || 17,562 || 14–17–1 || 29 || 
|- align="center" bgcolor="#ccffcc"
| 33 || December 17 || Washington Capitals || 1–2 || Colorado Avalanche || || Giguere || 16,011 || 15–17–1 || 31 || 
|- align="center" bgcolor="#ccffcc"
| 34 || December 19 || Philadelphia Flyers || 2–3 || Colorado Avalanche || SO || Giguere || 14,889 || 16–17–1 || 33 || 
|- align="center" bgcolor="#ccffcc"
| 35 || December 21 || St. Louis Blues || 2–3 || Colorado Avalanche || || Giguere || 15,421 || 17–17–1 || 35 || 
|- align="center" bgcolor="#ccffcc"
| 36 || December 23 || Tampa Bay Lightning || 1–2 || Colorado Avalanche || OT || Giguere || 16,165 || 18–17–1 || 37 || 
|- align="center" bgcolor="#ccffcc"
| 37 || December 26 || Colorado Avalanche || 4–2 || Minnesota Wild || || Varlamov || 19,290 || 19–17–1 || 39 || 
|- align="center" bgcolor="#FFBBBB"
| 38 || December 27 || Winnipeg Jets || 4–1 || Colorado Avalanche || || Giguere || 18,007 || 19–18–1 || 39 || 
|- align="center" bgcolor="#ccffcc"
| 39 || December 29 || Phoenix Coyotes || 2–3 || Colorado Avalanche || || Varlamov || 17,839 || 20–18–1 || 41 || 
|- align="center" bgcolor="#ccffcc"
| 40 || December 31 || Colorado Avalanche || 4–2 || Anaheim Ducks || || Giguere || 15,119 || 21–18–1 || 43 || 
|-

|- align="center" bgcolor="#ccffcc"
| 41 || January 2 || Colorado Avalanche || 2–1 || Los Angeles Kings || SO || Giguere || 18,118 || 22–18–1 || 45 || 
|- align="center" bgcolor="#ccffcc"
| 42 || January 6 || Colorado Avalanche || 4–0 || Chicago Blackhawks ||  || Varlamov || 21,807 || 23–18–1 || 47 || 
|- align="center" bgcolor="#FFBBBB"
| 43 || January 7 || Colorado Avalanche || 0–4  || St. Louis Blues || || Giguere || 19,150 || 23–19–1 || 47 || 
|- align="center" bgcolor="#FFBBBB"
| 44 || January 10 || Nashville Predators || 4–1  || Colorado Avalanche || || Varlamov || 14,417 || 23–20–1 || 47 || 
|- align="center" bgcolor="white"
| 45 || January 12 || Colorado Avalanche || 2–3 || Nashville Predators || OT || Giguere || 16,905 || 23–20–2 || 48 || 
|- align="center" bgcolor="#ccffcc"
| 46 || January 14 || Colorado Avalanche || 2–1 || Dallas Stars || || Giguere || 15,838 || 24–20–2 || 50 || 
|- align="center" bgcolor="#FFBBBB"
| 47 || January 16 || Colorado Avalanche || 1–6 || Phoenix Coyotes || || Varlamov || 12,757 || 24–21–2 || 50 || 
|- align="center" bgcolor="#ccffcc"
| 48 || January 18 || Florida Panthers || 3–4 || Colorado Avalanche || OT || Giguere || 13,465 || 25–21–2 || 52 || 
|- align="center" bgcolor="#ccffcc"
| 49 || January 21 || Colorado Avalanche || 3–1 || Los Angeles Kings || || Giguere || 18,118 || 26–21–2 || 54 || 
|- align="center" bgcolor="#FFBBBB"
| 50 || January 22 || Colorado Avalanche || 2–3 || Anaheim Ducks || || Giguere || 14,004 || 26–22–2 || 54 || 
|- align="center" bgcolor="#FFBBBB"
| 51 || January 24 || Minnesota Wild || 3–2 || Colorado Avalanche || || Giguere || 16,291 || 26–23–2 || 54 || 
|- align="center" bgcolor="#FFBBBB"
| 52 || January 31 || Colorado Avalanche || 2–3 || Edmonton Oilers || || Varlamov || 16,839 || 26–24–2 || 54 || 
|-

|- align="center" bgcolor="#FFBBBB"
| 53 || February 2 || Minnesota Wild || 1–0 || Colorado Avalanche || || Giguere || 14,186 || 26–25–2 || 54 || 
|- align="center" bgcolor="white"
| 54 || February 4 || Vancouver Canucks || 3–2 || Colorado Avalanche || SO || Giguere || 17,024 || 26–25–3 || 55 || 
|- align="center" bgcolor="#ccffcc"
| 55 || February 7 || Chicago Blackhawks || 2–5 || Colorado Avalanche || || Giguere || 16,553 || 27–25–3 || 57 || 
|- align="center" bgcolor="#ccffcc"
| 56 || February 10 || Carolina Hurricanes || 3–4 || Colorado Avalanche || OT || Giguere || 16,854 || 28–25–3 || 59 || 
|- align="center" bgcolor="white"
| 57 || February 11 || Colorado Avalanche || 2–3 || St. Louis Blues || OT || Varlamov || 19,150 || 28–25–4 || 60 || 
|- align="center" bgcolor="#FFBBBB"
| 58 || February 15 || Colorado Avalanche || 1–3 || Vancouver Canucks || || Varlamov || 18,890 || 28–26–4 || 60 || 
|- align="center" bgcolor="#ccffcc"
| 59 || February 17 || Colorado Avalanche || 3–1 || Edmonton Oilers || || Varlamov || 16,839 || 29–26–4 || 62 || 
|- align="center" bgcolor="#FFBBBB"
| 60 || February 19 || Colorado Avalanche || 1–5 || Winnipeg Jets ||  || Varlamov || 15,004 || 29–27–4 || 62 || 
|- align="center" bgcolor="#ccffcc"
| 61 || February 22 || Los Angeles Kings || 1–4 || Colorado Avalanche || || Varlamov || 15,907 || 30–27–4 || 64 || 
|- align="center" bgcolor="#ccffcc"
| 62 || February 24 || Colorado Avalanche || 5–0 || Columbus Blue Jackets || || Varlamov || 16,925 || 31–27–4 || 66 || 
|- align="center" bgcolor="#ccffcc"
| 63 || February 25 || Colorado Avalanche || 4–3 || Detroit Red Wings || || Giguere || 20,066 || 32–27–4 || 68 || 
|- align="center" bgcolor="#ccffcc"
| 64 || February 27 || Anaheim Ducks || 1–4 || Colorado Avalanche || || Varlamov || 15,133 || 33–27–4 || 70 || 
|-

|- align="center" bgcolor="#FFBBBB"
| 65 || March 1 || Columbus Blue Jackets || 2–0 || Colorado Avalanche || || Varlamov || 13,236 || 33–28–4 || 70 || 
|- align="center" bgcolor="#FFBBBB"
| 66 || March 3 || Pittsburgh Penguins || 5–1 || Colorado Avalanche || || Giguere || 18,007 || 33–29–4 || 70 || 
|- align="center" bgcolor="#ccffcc"
| 67 || March 4 || Colorado Avalanche || 2–0 || Minnesota Wild || || Varlamov || 17,354 || 34–29–4 || 72 || 
|- align="center" bgcolor="#ccffcc"
| 68 || March 6 || Minnesota Wild || 1–7 || Colorado Avalanche || || Varlamov || 13,385 || 35–29–4 || 74 || 
|- align="center" bgcolor="#FFBBBB"
| 69 || March 8 || Colorado Avalanche || 2–4 || Nashville Predators || || Varlamov || 17,113 || 35–30–4 || 74 || 
|- align="center" bgcolor="#ccffcc"
| 70 || March 10 || Edmonton Oilers || 2–3 || Colorado Avalanche || SO || Varlamov || 15,683 || 36–30–4 || 76 || 
|- align="center" bgcolor="#ccffcc"
| 71 || March 12 || Anaheim Ducks || 2–3 || Colorado Avalanche || OT || Varlamov || 15,045 || 37–30–4 || 78 || 
|- align="center" bgcolor="#ccffcc"
| 72 || March 14 || Colorado Avalanche || 5–4 || Buffalo Sabres || SO || Varlamov || 18,690 || 38–30–4 || 80 || 
|- align="center" bgcolor="white"
| 73 || March 15 || Colorado Avalanche || 0–1 || New Jersey Devils || SO || Giguere || 16,055 || 38–30–5 || 81 || 
|- align="center" bgcolor="#ccffcc"
| 74 || March 17 || Colorado Avalanche || 3–1 || New York Rangers || || Varlamov || 18,200 || 39–30–5 || 83 || 
|- align="center" bgcolor="#ccffcc"
| 75 || March 20 || Calgary Flames || 1–2 || Colorado Avalanche || OT || Varlmaov || 14,223 || 40–30–5 || 85 || 
|- align="center" bgcolor="#FFBBBB"
| 76 || March 22 || Colorado Avalanche || 2–3 || Phoenix Coyotes || || Varlamov || 14,938 || 40-31-5 || 85 || 
|- align="center" bgcolor="white"
| 77 || March 24 || Vancouver Canucks || 3–2 || Colorado Avalanche || OT || Varlamov || 18,007 || 40-31-6 || 86 || 
|- align="center" bgcolor="#FFBBBB"
| 78 || March 26 || Colorado Avalanche || 1–5 || San Jose Sharks ||  || Varlamov || 17,562 || 40-32-6 || 86 || 
|- align="center" bgcolor="#FFBBBB"
| 79 || March 28 || Colorado Avalanche || 0–1 || Vancouver Canucks ||  || Varlamov || 18,890 || 40-33-6 || 86 || 
|- align="center" bgcolor="#ccffcc"
| 80 || March 30 || Colorado Avalanche || 4–1 || Calgary Flames ||  || Varlamov || 19,289 || 41-33-6 || 88 || 
|-

|- align="center" bgcolor="#FFBBBB"
| 81 || April 5 || Columbus Blue Jackets || 5–2 || Colorado Avalanche ||  || Varlamov || 15,610 || 41-34-6 || 88 || 
|- align="center" bgcolor="#FFBBBB"
| 82 || April 7 || Nashville Predators || 6–1 || Colorado Avalanche  ||  || Giguere || 18,007 || 41-35-6 || 88 || 
|-

Playoffs
The Colorado Avalanche failed to qualify for the 2012 Stanley Cup playoffs.

Player statistics

Skaters
Note: GP = Games played; G = Goals; A = Assists; Pts = Points; +/− = Plus/minus; PIM = Penalty minutes

Goaltenders
Note: GP = Games played; TOI = Time on ice (minutes); W = Wins; L = Losses; OT = Overtime losses; GA = Goals against; GAA= Goals against average; SA= Shots against; Sv% = Save percentage; SO= Shutouts; G= Goals; A= Assists; PIM= Penalties in minutes

†Denotes player spent time with another team before joining Avalanche. Stats reflect time with the Avalanche only.
‡Traded mid-season

Awards and records

Awards

Records

Milestones

Transactions 
The Avalanche have been involved in the following transactions during the 2011–12 season:

Trades

Free agents acquired

Free agents lost

Claimed via waivers

Lost via waivers

Lost via retirement

Player signings

Draft picks 
Colorado's picks at the 2011 NHL Entry Draft in St. Paul, Minnesota.

See also 
 2011–12 NHL season

References

Colorado Avalanche seasons
C
C
Colorado Avalanche
Colorado Avalanche